Abderraouf Zarabi (born 26 March 1979) is an Algerian former professional footballer who played as a left-back. He made 22 appearances for the Algeria national team.

Club career

Hibernian
Zarabi was born in Algiers, Algeria. He signed with the Scottish Premier League club Hibernian in January 2008, but was released from his contract at the end of the 2007–08 season. He was released because his wife and child were rejected visas to come and live in Edinburgh.

Nîmes
Zarabi decided to return to French football, signing a contract with newly promoted Ligue 2 side Nîmes Olympique. On 1 August 2008, he made his debut for the club, starting in a Ligue 2 match against Brest.

Personal life
Abderraouf is the son of former Algeria international and NA Hussein Dey star Abdelaziz Zarabi. His younger brother Kheireddine Zarabi is also a footballer.

Career statistics

Notes

External links

Living people
1979 births
Algerian footballers
Footballers from Algiers
Association football fullbacks
Algeria international footballers
Algerian Ligue Professionnelle 1 players
Ligue 1 players
Ligue 2 players
Scottish Premier League players
NA Hussein Dey players
AC Ajaccio players
FC Gueugnon players
Hibernian F.C. players
Nîmes Olympique players
JS Kabylie players
CS Constantine players
MC Oran players
PK-35 Vantaa (men) players
Algerian expatriate footballers
Algerian expatriate sportspeople in France
Expatriate footballers in France
Algerian expatriate sportspeople in Scotland
Expatriate footballers in Scotland
Algerian expatriate sportspeople in Finland
Expatriate footballers in Finland
21st-century Algerian people